The Heart of a Rose is a 1919 British silent drama film directed by Jack Denton and starring Stella Muir, Henry Victor and Douglas Payne. 
The film has a northern setting and was filmed in Sheffield. Described as ‘a simple story of the novelette type,’ it apparently has some ‘interesting scenes of the interior of an iron foundry.’ The reviewer – credited only as Lantern Man by The Yorkshire Evening Post – is not that enthusiastic: ‘Although containing nothing new, it is thoroughly clean and wholesome, and possesses that “heart” interest so dear to most cinemagoers.’ This ‘heart interest’ is based upon Muir's journey from the slums of Sheffield  – ‘wherein the “motherly” child “minds” the unwashed ragged urchins, who are not poor because “the poor are only those who feel poor”‘ – to a new life as the ‘young lady of a mansion.’ In the view of Lantern Man, it ‘has an appeal that makes for popularity.’

Cast
 Stella Muir as Rose Fairlie  
 Henry Victor as Dick Darrell  
 Douglas Payne as Stephen Carnforth  
 Edward Thilby as Father Gregory  
 Joan Langford Reed as Baby

References

Bibliography
 Palmer, Scott. British Film Actors' Credits, 1895-1987. McFarland, 1998.

External links
 

1919 films
1919 drama films
British drama films
British silent feature films
Films directed by Jack Denton
British black-and-white films
1910s English-language films
1910s British films
Silent drama films